was a castle structure in Takamatsu, Kagawa Prefecture, Japan. The castle has been designated as Takamatsu city's Historic site. Kōzai clan's fortified residence Saryō Castle is located under the Katsuga castle.

Katuga castle was built by the Kōzai clan, one of the most powerful clans along with Sogō clan in the Sanuki Province and the castle became Kōzai clan's main castle for nearly 360 years.

References

Castles in Kagawa Prefecture
Historic Sites of Japan
Former castles in Japan
Ruined castles in Japan
Chōsokabe clan
Buildings and structures demolished in the 16th century